5th Central Committee may refer to:
Central Committee of the 5th Congress of the Russian Social Democratic Labour Party, 1907–1912
5th Central Committee of the Chinese Communist Party, 1927–1928
5th Central Committee of the Communist Party of Cuba, 1997–2011
5th Central Committee of the Polish United Workers' Party, 1968–1971
5th Central Committee of the Lao People's Revolutionary Party, 1991–1996
5th Central Committee of the Communist Party of Vietnam, 1982–1986
5th Central Committee of the Workers' Party of Korea, 1970–1980